Green Acres is a census-designated place in Riverside County, California. The 2010 United States census reported Green Acres's population was 1,805.

Geography
According to the United States Census Bureau, the CDP covers an area of 1.4 square miles (3.6 km), all of it land.

Demographics

At the 2010 census Green Acres had a population of 1,805. The racial makeup of Green Acres was 1,192 (66.0%) White, 34 (1.9%) African American, 41 (2.3%) Native American, 25 (1.4%) Asian, 2 (0.1%) Pacific Islander, 396 (21.9%) from other races, and 115 (6.4%) from two or more races. Hispanic or Latino of any race were 856 people (47.4%).

The census reported that 1,794 people (99.4% of the population) lived in households, 3 (0.2%) lived in non-institutionalized group quarters, and 8 (0.4%) were institutionalized.

There were 557 households, 238 (42.7%) had children under the age of 18 living in them, 284 (51.0%) were opposite-sex married couples living together, 91 (16.3%) had a female householder with no husband present, 51 (9.2%) had a male householder with no wife present.  There were 45 (8.1%) unmarried opposite-sex partnerships, and 5 (0.9%) same-sex married couples or partnerships. 92 households (16.5%) were one person and 32 (5.7%) had someone living alone who was 65 or older. The average household size was 3.22.  There were 426 families (76.5% of households); the average family size was 3.54.

The age distribution was 518 people (28.7%) under the age of 18, 188 people (10.4%) aged 18 to 24, 424 people (23.5%) aged 25 to 44, 473 people (26.2%) aged 45 to 64, and 202 people (11.2%) who were 65 or older.  The median age was 34.7 years. For every 100 females, there were 108.2 males.  For every 100 females age 18 and over, there were 103.6 males.

There were 641 housing units at an average density of 457.7 per square mile, of the occupied units 363 (65.2%) were owner-occupied and 194 (34.8%) were rented. The homeowner vacancy rate was 5.6%; the rental vacancy rate was 9.3%.  1,115 people (61.8% of the population) lived in owner-occupied housing units and 679 people (37.6%) lived in rental housing units.

References

Census-designated places in Riverside County, California
Census-designated places in California